Auquainville is a former commune in the Calvados department in the Normandy region of north-western France. On 1 January 2016, it was merged into the new commune of Livarot-Pays-d'Auge.

The inhabitants of the commune are known as Auquainvillais or Auquainvillaises.

Geography
Auquainville is located some 10 km south of Lisieux and 13 km west by north-west of Orbec. Access to the commune is by the D149 road which comes from Saint-Martin-de-Mailloc in the north-east and passes south through the commune and the village continuing to Livarot in the south-west. The D64 road comes from Saint-Martin-de-la-Lieue in the north and passes south through the east of the commune to Fervaques. The D135B branches east off the D64 in the commune and joins the D135 just east of the commune. Apart from the village, there are the hamlets of La Blondeliere in the west with Le Mollants and Le Maubuisson in the east. The commune is mixed forest and farmland with a particularly large forest to the west of the village (the Bois des Grandes Ventes).

The Touques river passes through the commune from south to north just east of the village and continues north to join the ocean at Trouville-sur-Mer. The Ruisseau de la Marette rises in the commune and flows east into the Touques.

History
In 1831, Auquainville (456 inhabitants) merged with Saint-Aubin-sur-Aquainville (91 inhabitants). Saint-Aubin-sur-Auquainville was south of Auquainville.

Administration

List of Successive Mayors

Demography

In 2017 the delegated commune had 298 inhabitants.

Culture and heritage

Civil heritage
The commune has a number of buildings and structures that are registered as historical monuments:
Lortier Manor (17th century)
Caudemone Manor (15th century)
A Mill for Fuller's Earth (19th century)

Religious heritage

The commune has several religious buildings and structures that are registered as historical monuments:
The Church of Saint Aubin (15th century). The church was decommissioned when Saint-Aubin-sur-Auquainville was incorporated into the commune of Auquainville in 1831 and was then used as a burial chapel by the Custine family. The choir with a flat apse indicates the building is from the late Middle Ages. It has a single nave and tower sitting on the western gable. The windows and door have without doubt been re-engineered in the 18th century. Inside, the building has retained all of its former layout. The Church contains many items that are registered as historical objects:
The Main Altar, seating, Tabernacle urn, Retable, an Altar Painting: the Agony of Christ in the garden of olives, and 2 Statues of St. Aubin and St. Sebastian (1787)
A Secondary Altar, seating, Retables, and 2 Statues of the Virgin and St. Quentin (18th century)
The Church of Notre-Dame (15th century). The Church contains many items that are registered as historical objects:
A Retable (17th century)
A Group Sculpture: Education of the Virgin (17th century)
A Retable (17th century)
A Painting: The Annunciation (17th century)
A Retable (17th century)
A Tabernacle (17th century)
A fragment of Stained glass (16th century)
A Painting: The placing in the tomb (17th century)
A Painting: The martyrdom of Saint Ursula (17th century)
An Altar (17th century)
An Altar (17th century)
The Altar facing (17th century)
The Altar wood carving of the Annunciation (17th century)
The Church of Saint Pierre has a number of items that are registered as historical objects:
A Stained glass window with a lady's head (16th century)
Decorative stained glass (19th century)
2 Stained glass windows: St. John and St. Mark and St. Matthew and St. Luke (19th century)

Notable people linked to the commune
Astolphe Louis Léonor, Marquis de Custine (1790-1857), writer, is buried in the Chapel of Saint-Aubin-sur-Auquainville.

See also
Communes of the Calvados department

External links
Auquaniville on the 1750 Cassini Map (N.B. Misspelt on the map)

References

Former communes of Calvados (department)
Populated places disestablished in 2016